The 2020–21 West of Scotland Football League (known as the PDM Buildbase West of Scotland League for sponsorship reasons) was the inaugural season of the West of Scotland Football League, with its top division as part of the sixth tier of the Scottish football pyramid system.

Originally, the league was set to begin in October 2020 with 67 teams split across two tiers and four leagues. However, as a result of the COVID-19 pandemic, 14 teams considered pulling out of the league before nine confirmed it was not financially viable to compete while supporters were not allowed into football grounds. The league decided not to penalise teams who chose to withdraw due to the pandemic and introduced proposals to have no promotion and relegation in the inaugural season.

On 11 January 2021 the league was suspended by the Scottish Football Association due to the escalating pandemic situation. On 17 March, the board declared the season null and void.

Premier Division

Teams
The Premier Division initially consisted of all 16 teams from the 2019–20 West Region Premiership, the top 3 teams based on points per game from the 2019–20 West Region Championship, and Bonnyton Thistle from the 2019–20 South of Scotland Football League.

Due to the start of the season being delayed by the COVID-19 pandemic, the division was split into two groups so that the number of games played by each team would be reduced from 38 to 28.

However, after the start date for the league was confirmed, five teams withdrew so the two groups were scrapped and the division reverted to 28 games played on a home and away basis, with no relegation from the Premier Division at the end of the season.

Stadia and locations

Notes

Withdrawn

League table

Results

Tier 7

Conference A

Stadia and locations

Notes

League table

Conference B

Stadia and locations

Notes

League table

Conference C

Stadia and locations

League table

Withdrawn

Notes
 Club with an SFA Licence (as of July 2020) eligible to participate in the Lowland League promotion play-off should they win the Premier Division.

References

External links

6
 
SCO
West of Scotland Football League